Abdirahman Yabarow is a Somali journalist. He hails from the Abgaal Hawiye clan. In the early 2000s, Yabarow worked in the UNDP's Documentation Unit. He later served as a Washington, D.C. correspondent for the BBC's Somali service. In 2009, Yabarow was appointed the Editor-in-Chief of the VOA's Somali service.

References

Living people
Ethnic Somali people
Somalian journalists
Somalian emigrants to the United States
Date of birth missing (living people)
Year of birth missing (living people)
Place of birth missing (living people)